Samuel Rousseau (born 1971) is a French visual artist. 

In 2011 he was nominee for the Marcel Duchamp Prize. In 2016, he received the Académie d'architecture medal.

Public collections 
 Fonds régional d'art contemporain, Alsace
 Grenoble Museum, France
 Artothèque art lending library, Bibliothèque municipale de Grenoble, France
 MONA, Museum of Old and New Art - Australia
 Seoul Museum of Contemporary Art - Korea

References

External links 
 Official website

Living people
1971 births
Artists from Marseille
20th-century French artists
21st-century French artists
French contemporary artists